Blue Demon is a Spanish-language television series produced by Teleset for Televisa and Sony Pictures Television. The series is based on the life of the famous Mexican professional wrestler and actor Blue Demon. On November 11, 2016 the series was published on the Blim platform the first season and consists of 20 episodes. The series starred Tenoch Huerta as Blue Demon and Ana Brenda Contreras as Goyita. The series premiered on January 15, 2017 in the United States on UniMás and ended on July 15, 2017.

Plot summary 
This is the story of Blue Demon, of its origin, its life and its legend. But also that of Alejandro Muñóz, the strong and persevering man who had to walk a road full of obstacles to the fight of his life, Of his immense love for Goyita, the woman of his life, and how, after crowning himself champion, to touch the sky for a moment, he discovers that he still has a greater challenge: to recover the man under the mask.

Cast

Main 

 Tenoch Huerta as Alejandro Muñóz / Blue Demon
 Ana Brenda Contreras as Gregoria Vera / Goyita
 Joaquín Cosio as Ignacio Vera
 Ianis Guerrero as Carlos Cruz
 Silverio Palacios as Tío Crescencio
 Tomás Goro as Efraín Larrañaga
 Alejandro de Marino as Franklin Fernández
 Arturo Carmona as Ala Dorada
 Andrés Almeida as Guillén
 José Sefami
 Gloria Stalina as Fina
 Ana Layevska as Silvia Garza
 Juan Pablo Medina as Doctor Buelna
 María Nela Sinisterra
 Diana Lein as Rosario Castro
 Felipe Nájera as Madariaga

Recurring 
 Arnulfo Reyes Sánchez as Checo López 
 César René Vigné as Calavera
 Harding Junior as Macumbo
 Nacho Tahhan as Daniel Porier

Episodes

Awards and nominations

References

External links 

Mexican television miniseries
Spanish-language television shows
Univision original programming
Blim TV original programming
2017 Mexican television series endings
2016 Mexican television series debuts
Sony Pictures Television telenovelas
2010s Mexican drama television series